Polangui General Comprehensive High School (PGCHS) is the flagship secondary school of the municipality of Polangui and one of the leading schools in the province of Albay. It has an average population of 4,000 students. PGCHS has seven present curricula. It is located along the Buhi-Polangui Road at Purok Earth, Centro Occidental, Polangui, Albay; having a total service area of 48,708 square meters. It is 39.1 kilometers away from the Department of Education (DepEd) Albay Division Office.

PGCHS is a cluster center for all private and public schools in the municipalities of Polangui, Oas, Libon, the city of Ligao and Bato, Camarines Sur. It is also one of the 54 regional leader schools in the country. As a leader school, it serves as a center for training and development of materials and staff in Home Management, Information Technology, Communication Arts, Sciences, and Social Studies.

History
Polangui General Comprehensive High School began as the Albay High School of Polangui (AHSP). It was one of four high schools in the province of Albay when it opened in 1948. The others were Guinobatan High School (now Marcial O. Raola Memorial School), Legazpi High School (now Bicol University College of Education Integrated Laboratory School), and Tabaco High School (now Tabaco National High School). The initial enrollment was 234 students, with nine teachers, a clerk, and a janitor. Mr. Sisenando Reantaso was the school's first principal. Mr. Victor Pineda took over as principal in 1953.

AHSP held classes in the municipal building and a rented house for about two years. Following that, it purchased property in Barangay Centro Occidental, on the Buhi-Polangui provincial road leading to Barangay Lidong. The site was a 66,607 square meter lot purchased from Mr. Eleuterio Basquiez with funds raised by the PTA through municipal council representation in accordance with Resolution No. 76 passed on August 14, 1953. On September 3, 1953, the Provincial Government validated the sale through Resolution No. 141.

Under the authority of Resolution No. 93 approved November 13, 1956 by the municipal council of Polangui, duly certified and concurred with by the Division Superintendent of Schools, Pastor Escalante, on February 12, 1959, 17,899 square meters (Lot 2) provided campus for the School for Philippine Craftsmen (now Bicol University Polangui Campus).

Mrs. Aurora R. Encisa was the principal from 1963 to 1980. On June 18, 1964, President Diosdado P. Macapagal signed Republic Act 3993 into law, converting AHSP into Polangui General Comprehensive High School (PGCHS), a national secondary school. The "new" school was modeled after comprehensive high schools in Detroit, Michigan, United States. It was to be a community school with a diverse curriculum aimed at meeting the diverse interests and needs of both students and the community. Mrs. Encisa was also in charge when PGCHS held its first extension classes in Ponso, Polangui in 1965.

Oas opened extension classes during the 1972-1973 school year. The latter was phased out in 1984 to make way for the establishment of the Oas Polytechnic School. In 1978-1979, an extension school was established in Balogo, a barangay of Oas in the province's northern mountain ranges. Another extension school was established in La Medalla, Polangui, in 1991.

When Mrs. Encisa left due to a promotion, Mr. Vicente Batbat took over as administrator from 1980 to 1981. Mrs. Felicitas Ll. Olondriz took over as principal in 1982. Mr. Wilfredo E. Pura took over after she retired in 1996. Mrs. Coreta O. Marollano took over as principal after Mr. Pura retired in 2004; she retired a year later. PGCHS was under new administration in 2005, with principal Osias S. Monforte. President Gloria Macapagal-Arroyo transformed all Barangay high schools into National High Schools during his tenure. All PGCHS extension schools became independent schools.

Dr. Sancita B. Pearubia oversaw the school from 2010 to 2015, following Mr. Monforte's departure due to a promotion. Dr. Pearubia is currently serving as Officer-in-Charge in addition to her official position as Education Program Supervisor for Mathematics in the Division of Albay. She was succeeded as principal by Dr. Emma R. Morasa from 2015 to 2018, and then by Dr. Alice R. Lim from 2018 to 2019. Dr. Lourdes R. Bigcas currently oversees the school.

PGCHS has nearly 4,500 students, 142 regular teachers and employees, two librarians, a school nurse, a five-man security unit, a five-man janitorial and messengerial team, and an accounting, clerical, and property office with six employees, one driver, contractual and casuals.

Vision
Dynamic, academically-competent and upright students responsive to the general welfare of their fellow men.

Mission
The PGCHS commits itself to provide the youth of secondary school age an education that shall mold every young boy or girl into a spiritually, morally, physically, and socially upright citizen and a disciplined and literate member of the community.

Objectives
As embodied in the PGCHS Educational Development Plan, the PGCHS works towards the attainment of the following general objectives:
 To continue promoting the objectives of elementary education and to discover and enhance the different aptitude and interests of the students to prepare them for higher education and the world of work;
 To develop proper values and attitudes necessary for personal, community and national development;
 To improve educational leadership, planning and management capabilities of school managers, teaching and non-teaching personnel;
 To strengthen integration and linkages with other institutions and agencies for better coordination in the implementation of government thrusts and programs;
 To utilize not only the formal methods but also the non-formal methods of delivery of educational services.

Administration 
 ALICIA R. LIM: Principal IV

Present curricula
The school's present curricula is based on the K to 12 Basic Education Curriculum (K-12 BEC). The implementation of the program is pursuant to Republic Act (RA) 10533 or the Enhanced Basic Education Act of 2013 signed by President Benigno Aquino III on May 15, 2013.

The overall design of Grades 1 to 12 curriculum follows the spiral approach across subjects by building on the same concepts developed in increasing complexity and sophistication starting from grade school. Teachers are expected to use the spiral/progression approach in teaching competencies.

Subjects are taught from the simplest concepts to more complicated concepts through grade levels in spiral progression. As early as elementary, students gain knowledge in areas such as Biology, Geometry, Earth Science, Chemistry, and Algebra. This ensures a mastery of knowledge and skills after each level.

Junior high school program (Grades 7-10)

Engineering and Science Education Program (ESEP)
 The program has an enriched Science, Mathematics and English curriculum in addition to the standard requirements of the secondary education curriculum.
 It provides additional enrichment material for Science and Technology, Mathematics and Earth Science.
 They must maintain a final grade of not less than 80% in all subjects.

Revised Basic Education Curriculum (RBEC)
 This is a regular curriculum with special features for students whose needs are preparation for higher learning and gainful employment

Special Program in the Arts (SPA)
 The program provides special curriculum offerings for the development of talents and interest in visual arts, creative writing in English and Filipino, music, theatre arts, dance arts in addition to the standard requirements of the secondary education curriculum.
 Special Program in the Arts envisions an excellent young artist with aesthetic potential and renewed spiritually committed to the preservation of Filipino Culture and heritage. Its objective is to develop students with special inclination to music, visual arts, theater arts, media arts and dance. It was formally introduced in June 2005, with the pioneering batch graduating in 2009.

Special Program in Sports (SPS)
 Special Program in Sports (SPS) is in line with the efforts of the Department of Education to institutionalize a program that will identify/discover students with potential talent in sports and hone their skills for higher levels of athletic competitions. It was formally introduced in June 2012, with the pioneering batch graduating in 2018.

Alternative Learning System (ALS)
 This program aims to provide alternative mode of delivering secondary education. It puts premium on independent, self-pacing and flexible study to reach learners who are unable to start or complete secondary education due to problem of time, distance, education design, physical impairment, financial difficulties or family problems.
 The Alternative Learning System is learner-centered and makes use of a wide range of teaching/learning strategies through combination of print and non-print media.

Late Afternoon Class (LAC)

Senior high school program (Grades 11-12)

Academic Track

Arts and Design Track

Sports Track

Technical-Vocational Livelihood Track

Homeroom sections

There are 77 homerooms as of School Year 2013-2014.

Student programs and services 
In line with its objectives of developing a well-rounded personality of Polangui General Comprehensive High School, the school maintains the following facilities and implements the following services:

Guidance services
Formal guidance counseling services as well as informal guidance counseling are provided to the students through frequent, cordial and simulating contacts.

The Guidance Office is located on the left portion of the Main Building, beside the Cashier's Office.

Prefect of discipline
This office is directly in charge of discipline. The coordinator and members are responsible for the discipline of students and investigation of violation of school rules and regulations. They recommend penalties to the principal.

PGCHS' prefect of discipline is Mr. Wilfredo R. Locsin. His office is located in front of the PTA Office, near the students' pavilion.

Library services
Books in the library are available on open shelves. Students can use them freely. Books should be returned to their respective shelves after use.

The school library is located at the second floor of the Marcos Building, in front of the SOF Building.

Computer laboratory
The PGCHS computer laboratory boasts of its modernism, equipped with more than 30 computer units and an in-house E-Library. These laboratories provide services to the students during their classes in computer and in the computer-aided instruction.

The computer laboratory and E-Library are located at the first floor of the Marcos Building, in front of the SOF Building.

Health services
To promote good health and well-being of the students, the school provides first aid in emergency cases.

The school nurse is Mrs. Neri S. Lubi. The school medical clinic is located at the ground floor of the AHSP-PGCHS Alumni Building.

Food services
Good nutrition is essential to student's growth, development and achievement. The school canteen provides these services. It serves the food and nutritional needs of the students like snacks, lunch, breakfast, and school supplies.

The school canteen also serves as a laboratory for Home Economics, retail trade and in the incidental teaching of health and nutrition. It provides hands-on training for students on planning, purchasing, handling and storage, preparation, serving and sale on safe and nutritious meals.

The school canteen is located beside the SOF Building (Foodmart), behind the ESF Building (FEWP Canteen) and near the JICA Building (YECS Canteen).

Science laboratory
The science laboratory provide services both for Science teachers and students to help facilitate the learning of Science and Technology courses. They provide laboratory facilities that would create proper atmosphere conductive for science investigation and in the preparation, distribution and the use of science equipment and supplies in their demonstration class, individual or group experiments and projects.

The PGCSH science laboratory is located at the ground floor of the ESF Building.

TLE laboratories
These laboratories provide services to the students in TLE classes in the four curricular areas:
Home Economics
Agriculture
Industrial Arts
Entrepreneurship

Religious services
To enrich the classroom experiences and to develop in the students the desired values and attitudes as persons, the campus ministries in the different religious sectors provide services for worshiping and living. To attain these goals, they conduct prayer sessions, class formation, Eucharistic celebration, meditations and readings of magazine, Bible and pamphlets in the Meditation
Garden located at the back of the left wing of the main building.

The school chapel is located in front of the Main Building, near the basketball court.

Student organizations

 Supreme Student Government (SSG)
 The Courier 
 Ang Taga-Ulat  
 Youth for Environment in Schools Organization (YES-O) 
 PGCHS Varsity 
 Drum and Lyre Corps 
 Citizenship Advancement Training 
 Rondalla Band 
 Math Club 
 English Club
 Science Club 
 Samahan ng mga Mag-aaral sa Filipino
 UNESCO Club
 MAPEH Club 
 Values Education Club 
 ICT Society 
 TLE Club 
 Student Technologists and Entrepreneurs of the Philippines (STEP) Club 
 Youth Entrepreneurship and Cooperativism in Schools (YECS) Club
 Little Doctors and Nurses Club 
 Grade 7 Barangay Organization 
 Grade 8 Barangay Organization
 Grade 9 Barangay Organization 
 Senior Barangay Organization

Non-student organizations

Student awards and achievements

Student leadership
Students Excellence in Academics and Leadership (SEAL) 2010 (Ten Most Outstanding Students of Albay):Awarded to Rhod Jeran S. Sabater (2011 Class Valedictorian-ESEP), Micah O. Madrelejos and Antonette R. Reburiano
Students Excellence in Academics and Leadership (SEAL) 2009 (Ten Most Outstanding Students of Albay):Awarded to Joel E. Sabio, Jr. (2010 Class Valedictorian-ESEP) and Kate P. Samaniego (2010 Class Salutatorian-ESEP)

Notable events hosted
 2006 Regional Secondary Schools Press Conference (RSSPC)
 9th Division Youth Congress in August 2007
 2008 Cluster Secondary Schools Press Conference (CSSPC)
 2008 Division Secondary Schools Press Conference (DSSPC)
 2009 Division STEP Skills Development and Competition
 2011 Division Science Competitions
 2012 Regional Secondary Schools Press Conference (RSSPC)

AHSP-PGCHS Annual Alumni Grand Homecoming
The annual tradition of PGCHS Alumni Homecoming was initiated was Batch 1976 in 2006. Since then, every Black Saturday, the gathering is being held where former students of the different batches return to PGCHS to reminisce old-time memories and to reunite with former batchmates and mentors. Election of the AHSP-PGCHS Alumni Association is conducted every 2 years.

Notable alumni
 Reno G. Lim (Batch 1976) - Former Congressman, 3rd District of Albay (2007–2010)
 Dianne Elaine S. Necio (Batch 2007) - Binibining Pilipinas International 2011, Binibining Pilipinas 2010 First Runner-up, Miss Tabak 2009, Mutya ng Bicolandia

PGCHS hymn
Lyrics is by Salvador "Buddy" M. Robrigado, Sr. and the music is by Oscar R. Reburiano.

PGCHS march
Lyrics is by Loida S. Nas and the music is by Oscar R. Reburiano.

Notes

 Changed to Edukasyon sa Pagpapakatao (ESP) in the K-12 BEC.
 Changed to Environmental Science in the K-12 BEC.
 The K to 12 Basic Education Curriculum (K-12 BEC) and the Alternative Learning System (ALS) are excluded in the sectioning process.
 Dissolved in 2006 due to the low performance of the incoming batch in the National Achievement Test (NAT). Reinstated in 2009 when the incoming batch achieved high scores in NAT.
 Was also dissolved in 2006 consequent to the exclusion of III-Charles. Re-included in 2010.
 Dissolved in 2011.

References

Schools in Albay
Educational institutions established in 1948
High schools in the Philippines
1948 establishments in the Philippines